Chropyně is a town in Kroměříž District in the Zlín Region of the Czech Republic. It has about 4,700 inhabitants.

Administrative parts
The village of Plešovec is an administrative part of Chropyně.

Geography
It lies in the Upper Morava Valley. The river Malá Bečva flows through the town and other small watercourses flow into it in the municipal territory. The confluence of the Malá Bečva with the Morava is situated on the southern border of the territory.

There are several ponds in the territory. The largest of them is Zámecký in the centre of the town. The pond area is protected as a national nature reserve.

History
The first written mention of Chropyně is from 1261, when the settlement was donated to the newly established monastery in Vizovice. During the rule of lords of Ludanice in the 15th century, a set of fish ponds was built here and Chropyně became the centre of a small estate. The fish farming brought economic prosperity to Chropyně and in 1535, it was promoted to a market town by King Ferdinand I.

In 1615–1617, Chropyně was owned by Cardinal Franz von Dietrichstein. From 1617 to 1848, it was a property of Olomouc bishopric. In the 19th century, many large fires damaged Chropyně.

A small spa for treatment of musculoskeletal disorders and diseases associated with high blood pressure was founded here in 1950. In 1970, Chropyně was promoted to a town. The town was damaged by the 1997 Central European flood and the spa was completely destroyed.

Demographics

Sights
The main landmark is the Chropyně Castle. It was built in 1615 on the site of an older castle. In the 19th century, it was  modified to a hunting chateau. Today it is open to the public. It contains several expositions, including the monument of painter Emil Filla, which is the most famous native.

Notable people
Emil Filla (1882–1953), painter

References

External links

 

Cities and towns in the Czech Republic
Populated places in Kroměříž District